The 2003 German Athletics Championships were held at the Donaustadion in Ulm on 28–29 June 2003.

Results

Men

Women

References 
 Results sources:
 Men: 
 Women: 

2003
German Athletics Championships
German Athletics Championships